Eastern West Virginia Community & Technical College is a public community college with its main campus in Moorefield, West Virginia. Eastern WVCTC offers 11 degree programs as well as numerous skill sets and certificates. It is part of the West Virginia Community and Technical College System.

Academics 
Eastern WVCTC offers the Associate in Applied Science (A.A.S.) degree.  Additionally, it also offers apprenticeships and other career development opportunities and credentials.

External links
Official website

Buildings and structures in Hardy County, West Virginia
Education in Hardy County, West Virginia
West Virginia Community and Technical College System